Linus Casper Carlstrand (born 31 August 2004) is a Swedish footballer who plays for IFK Göteborg as a forward. He is the son of former footballer Lars-Gunnar Carlstrand.

References

External links 
 

2004 births
Living people
Swedish footballers
Sweden youth international footballers
Allsvenskan players
IFK Göteborg players
Association football forwards